A constitutional referendum was held in Kyrgyzstan on 11 December 2016. The constitutional amendments were approved by around 80% of voters.

Background
The post-independence constitution was introduced in 1993, with modifications made following referendums in 1996, 1998, 2003, 2007 and 2010. However, the current constitution prohibits any amendments being made until 2020. The original version of the 2010 constitution has been lost.

Proposed changes
The proposed changes to the constitution were put forward by five parties, and included increasing the powers of the Prime Minister and Supreme Council, as well as making reforms to the judicial system. The proposed reforms also established that marriage could be only "between a man and a woman" instead of "between two persons"; this was criticized by the Venice Commission of the Council of Europe.

Conduct
There were some reports of alleged fraud. Some that political parties had resorted to vote buying and people told that they were offered 500 to 1,000 soms ($7 to $14) per vote. Speaking at a press conference, deputy Interior Minister Almaz Orozaliev reported five such cases (three in the Bishkek and two in the northern Chui region).

Results

References

2016 in Kyrgyzstan
2016 referendums
December 2016 events in Asia
Referendums in Kyrgyzstan